Eduardo Benot Rodríguez (26 November 1822 – 27 July 1907) was a Spanish lexicographer, academic, poet, educator and politician advocate of federal republicanism. Follower of Francisco Pi y Margall, he briefly served as Minister of Development during the First Spanish Republic.

Biography

Early life 
Born in Cádiz on 26 November 1822, his father had Italian origin. He was a feeble child during infancy. He took studies at the Colegio de San Pedro and later the Colegio de San Felipe Neri.

Already writing as teenager for the newspaper El Defensor del Pueblo, he later wrote for La Alborada, as well he authored 3 theatre pieces.

Working since 1840 for the municipal beneficence office, he was hired as teacher at San Felipe Neri in 1848 (soon starting to publish grammar books), and as lecturer on Geodesy and Astronomy at the Naval Observatory in San Fernando (1857).

Sexenio Democrático 
After the 1868 Glorious Revolution, Benot became a member of the Constituent Cortes formed upon the 1869 election in representation of the district of Jerez de la Frontera (Cádiz), overcoming Juan Prim at the election, although Prim was elected anyway as he was candidate in another district.

He was one of the supporters of a manifesto promoted by Francisco Pi y Margall on 10 May 1870 which reaffirmed on "pactist" federalism, in response to the so-called "Declaration of the Republican Press" (published on 7 May 1870), which attempted to resignify federalism as a simple administrative decentralization. He was later elected Senator in representation of the province of Girona in the 1872–1873 period.

Following the proclamation of the First Spanish Republic in February 1873, he earned again a seat at the Congress of Deputies in representation of the district of Algeciras (Cádiz) at the May 1873 election. He was appointed as Minister of Development of the executive power presided by Pi y Margall in June 1873.

The law failed to be effectively enforced, however. He also forced ayuntamientos to pay for teachers' wage arrears.

He exiled after the 1874 coup of Pavía to Portugal, where he began to edit the bi-weekly La Europa, only to return to Madrid some time later, as Cánovas del Castillo achieved, via a requirement for expulsion to the Portuguese authorities, the forced return to Spain of Benot.

Later life 

Already a correspondent member of the Royal Spanish Academy since 1860, he was later elected as numerary member, taking possession of the Chair Z on 14 April 1889, reading ¿Qué es hablar? a speech replied by Víctor Balaguer. His contributions to Spanish grammar have received diverse and lavish praises, but they tend to agree in pointing out the "modernity" of his approaches, sometimes even considered to be a "direct precursor" of "modern linguistics".

Benot would return to the Lower House, elected in representation of Madrid at the 1893 election.

He replaced Pi y Margall at the helm of the Federal Democratic Republican Party when the latter died. He could not however avoid the fracture of the party in May 1905. Catalanist republicans would reject from then on the insertion within the main stem of the Spanish left-wing.

Ill and progressively blind since 1901, he died poor at Calle del Marqués de Villamagna 6, Madrid, on 27 July 1907.

References 
Citations

Bibliography
 
 
 
 
 
 

Spanish republicans
Members of the Congress of Deputies (Spain)
Exiled Spanish politicians
Members of the Congress of Deputies of the Spanish Restoration
Members of the Royal Spanish Academy
Members of the Senate of Spain
Government ministers during the First Spanish Republic